

The Ratana Varabhorn Order of Merit was established on 1 August 1911 by King Rama VI of The Kingdom of Siam (now Thailand) to reward personal service to the sovereign. Members are entitled to use the postnominals ร.ว.

Insignia
The decoration consists of a single class (Knight). The insignia for this class is a pendant on the order chain or on neck ribbon.
 The Order chain consists of the royal monograms in white enamel, which are interrupted with gold Thai royal crowns, and with the royal emblems in blue enamel. The central locket of chain is the royal emblem made from diamonds.
 The pendant has a dark-blue enamel field, surrounded by a ring of diamonds. The ring is surrounded by four small sceptres with elephant tusks, eight diamond leaves and four gold cyphers. The pendant is crowned with the royal crown, with a beam of sunlight at the tip.

Selected recipients 
King Prajadhipok
Queen Savang Vadhana
Prince Chakrabongse Bhuvanath
Princess Indrasakdi Sachi
Prince Boworadet
Princess Suvadhana
Princess Bejaratana
Field Marshal Plaek Phibunsongkhram
Prince Aditya Dibabha

References

External links

 Pendant Image

 
Orders of chivalry of Thailand
Awards established in 1911
1911 establishments in Siam